Kraljevi ulice is a Croatian band founded by Miran Hadži Veljković and Zlatko Petrović Pajo. The band's name translates as "Kings of the Street". They were chosen to represent Croatia at the Eurovision Song Contest 2008 in Belgrade, Serbia. They sang "Romanca" alongside 75 Cents, and came in 21st.

75 Cents was the stage name of Croatian singer Ladislav Demeterffy a.k.a. Laci (29 January 1933 – 19 November 2010) who performed with Kraljevi ulice in the Eurovision Song Contest 2008. He was dubbed "75 Cents", a reference to his age at the time (75). , he was the oldest known participant in the history of the contest, but had this record beaten in May 2012, when Natalya Pugacheva (late October 1935 – 2019) represented Russia as part of the group Buranovskiye Babushki. Later, Emil Ramsauer (1918 - 2021) of the band Takasa who represented Switzerland in the Eurovision Song Contest 2013 broke the record. Demeterffy later died at Vinogradska Hospital in Zagreb on 19 November 2010, aged 77.

References

External links

Eurovision Song Contest entrants for Croatia
Eurovision Song Contest entrants of 2008